Mníšek is municipality and village in Liberec District in the Liberec Region of the Czech Republic. It has about 1,700 inhabitants.

Administrative parts
The village of Fojtka is an administrative part of Mníšek.

Etymology
The German name was derived from Einsiedler, i.e. "hermit". The Czech name was created as a free translation and is a diminutive of the word mnich, i.e. "monk".

Geography
The western part of the municipal territory with the Mníšek village lies in the Zittau Basin, but most of the territory lies in the Jizera Mountains.

The built-up area is situated in the valley of the Jeřice River and the Fojtka Stream. Their confluence is in the centre of Mníšek. Fojtka Reservoir was built on the stream in 1904–1906. It is used for recreational purposes and as flood protection.

History
The first written mention of Mníšek is from 1381. The village of Fojtka was first mentioned in 1559.

Sights
The landmark of Mníšek is the Church of Saint Nicholas. The original wooden church was replaced by a stone one in 1570, then it was replaced by the current Baroque structure in 1739. The tower was raised in 1774. The rectory was built next to the church is 1767.

References

External links

Villages in Liberec District